Orhangi River is a small ephemeral stream that flows through the Pakistani megacity of Karachi from north east to the centre and flows into the Lyari River towards Arabian Sea.

References 

Rivers of Karachi